Terence Neil "Tiny" Betts  (13 April 1926 – 4 February 2017) was an Australian rugby union player who played for Queensland and the national team.

He was awarded the Medal of the Order of Australia in 2009, for service to rugby union football as a player, administrator and coach.

References

1926 births
2017 deaths
Australian rugby union players
Australia international rugby union players
Queensland Reds players
Rugby union players from Brisbane
Recipients of the Medal of the Order of Australia
Rugby union props